Gateway High School is located in Kissimmee, Florida. It is home to Osceola County's International Baccalaureate Program and is also the site for one of the largest Performing Arts Centers in the county,  which houses the Thespian Society, known for its various productions and awards won at the Florida Thespian Competition.

Notable alumni
Joe Torres, baseball coach

References

External links 
 

Educational institutions established in 1986
High schools in Osceola County, Florida
Public high schools in Florida
1986 establishments in Florida
Schools in Kissimmee, Florida